Edmund Gerald LaCour Jr. (born 1985) is an American lawyer who has served as the Solicitor General of Alabama since May 3, 2019. He is a former nominee to be a United States district judge of the United States District Court for the Middle District of Alabama.

Biography 

LaCour received a Bachelor of Arts, summa cum laude, from Birmingham-Southern College, a Master of Arts from Trinity College Dublin, and a Juris Doctor from Yale Law School. After law school, LaCour served as a law clerk to Judge William H. Pryor Jr. of the United States Court of Appeals for the Eleventh Circuit. He then worked at Baker Botts and Bancroft PLLC. He later became a partner at Kirkland & Ellis, before being appointed Solicitor General of Alabama in May 2019.

Failed nomination to district court under Trump 

On May 20, 2020, President Trump announced his intent to nominate LaCour to serve as a United States District Judge of the United States District Court for the Middle District of Alabama. On June 2, 2020, his nomination was sent to the Senate. President Trump nominated LaCour to the seat vacated by Judge Andrew L. Brasher, who was elevated to the United States Court of Appeals for the Eleventh Circuit. On January 3, 2021, his nomination was returned to the President under Rule XXXI, Paragraph 6 of the United States Senate. Later that same day, his renomination was sent to the Senate. On February 4, 2021, his nomination was withdrawn by President Joe Biden.

References 

1985 births
Living people
21st-century American lawyers
Alabama lawyers
Alumni of Trinity College Dublin
Birmingham–Southern College alumni
People associated with Kirkland & Ellis
Solicitors General of Alabama
Yale Law School alumni